Manga Bible ( = Minna no Seisho - Manga shiriizu, meaning "Everybody's Bible - Manga Series") is a six-volume manga series based on the Christian Bible created under the direction of the non-profit organization Next, a group formed by people from the manga industry. Though first published in English, the books are originally written in Japanese and each volume is illustrated by a Japanese manga artist. Each book is adapted from the Bible by Hidenori Kumai. The first two books were illustrated by manga artist Kozumi Shinozawa, while the remaining four were by Ryō Azumi.

The first book in the series, Manga Messiah was published in 2006 and covered the four gospels of the Bible: Matthew, Mark, Luke, and John. Manga Metamorphosis (2008) covers the events in Acts and several of Paul's letters. Manga Mutiny (2008, 2009) begins in Genesis and ends in Exodus. Manga Melech (2010) picks up where Manga Mutiny left off and continues into the reign of David. Manga Messengers (2011) addresses events starting with the reign of King Solomon and takes stories from several of the major and minor prophets, and the Book of Esther and concludes with anticipation of a messiah. The sixth and the final book from the series, Manga Majesty (2019) concludes the story of apostle John's revelation in the island of Patmos and the revelations that mark the end of days.

Production
The Manga Bible series is the creation of Next, a non-profit organization created in 2006 to produce and distribution biblically-based manga series for distribution in a multitude of languages worldwide. Next was formed by Roald Lidal, general director of New Life League Japan, pulling together manga publishing and printing professionals from Japan, and includes Japanese manga artists and other professionals in the manga industry.

Lidal created the Manga Bible series in order to "reach children who might resist traditional Bible translations and never attend a church." When he first announced his vision, it was met with some derision, with other Christians feeling the books would be insulting to the gospel. Lidal was persistent, and continued his vision to produce the six book series, with four covering the Old Testament and two covering the New Testament portions of the Christian Bible.

Each book in the series is initially written in Japanese by Christian Japanese artists, then translated to additional languages and published by regional religious publishers. Each language edition is reviewed by members of regional bible societies before publication, to ensure accurate translation.

Media
The first book of the series, Manga Messiah, was scripted by Hidenori Kumai and illustrated by Kelly Kozumi Shinozawa. Though initially written in Japanese, the English edition was published first, premiering in the United Kingdom and the Philippines in 2006. In North America, Tyndale House purchased the English rights for all the books in the series, publishing Manga Messiah in September 2007. COMIX35 acted as the English consultants for translating the Japanese editions into English. The Spanish language editions are being published by the American Bible Society. The Japanese language edition was published in Japan in February 2008. All 6 volumes of the Japanese versions were made available as a box set on April 12, 2021. After the completion of the 6th volume, Manga Majesty, the volume reading were arranged according to the Old Testament and the New Testament in the order of Manga Mutiny, Manga Melech, Manga Messengers, Manga Messiah, Manga Metamorphosis, and Manga Majesty respectively.

Volume list

Booklets
An abbreviated booklet version of Manga Messiah is called Manga Mission, followed by The Messiah, produced at a lower cost for mass distributions in 2016.

Reception
Before its creation, some Christians expressed concern that the Manga Bible series format would "cheapen the gospel." The first book of the series, Manga Messiah, received mixed reviews from critics. Matthew J. Brady of the website "Manga Life" found Manga Messiah to be "a fairly authentic manga," feeling it had an authentic manga background and styling, but showing Western-influences in its use of full-color pages and greater amounts of captioning and text. As a whole, he felt the book was a faithful adaptation of the gospels, but did note that some slight liberties taken with the story would "probably bother steadfast Christians".

Comixology's Jason Thompson was less impressed, heavily criticizing the art of the book, referring to it as the "most basic kind of manga shorthand—awkward geometric faces with big eyes, big hair, exaggerated expressions" with "blandly attractive" main characters, "dorky caricatures" of old RPG characters used for the villains, and crudely drawn backgrounds. Both reviewers felt the book tried to include too much information, and that the authors used Jesus' Hebrew name "Yeshuah" in an attempt to make it more palatable to non-Christian readers. They also both criticized the book's occasional odd phrasing when key dialog was rewritten using modern English.

In an editorial piece, Bruce Wilson of The Huffington Post attacked the book, repeatedly quoting an anonymous source who sent him a copy of it, and Chip Berlet, a senior analyst at Political Research Associates. The trio felt the manga contained extreme anti-Semitic views and was pushing for an idea of "objectifying Jews as non human". Berlet is quoting as stating that Manga Messiah is "A colorful comic training manual for motivating young leaders of the next pogrom against Jews. Not just offensive -- ghastly and horrific in content with a clear enemy scapegoat identified for venting apocalyptic religious bigotry." In a follow-up piece, Wilson himself claimed that "Manga Messiah depicts sinister, swarthy rabbis scheming with the devils and Jews laughing at and taunting Jesus as Christ is nailed to the cross. There are no "good" Jews depicted in the comic."

Reviewer Deirdre J. Good, of the Christian think tank Ekklesia, rebuked the book for its removal of the tension between Jesus and his family and the removal of Judas from The Last Supper, suspecting that Japanese family values had been allowed to intrude upon the original text. She partially supports Wilson's assessment, feeling the depictions of the Pharisees were implausible and that "most depictions of Pharisees or other opponents are caricatures of unappealing people which become sterotypes [sic] by the time one has finished reading the book". As a whole, she felt it was too simplistic, even for a teenage audience.

References

External links
 Official Next Manga Bible website
 Official Japan Bible Society  Manga Bible website 
 Official Japan Bible Society  Manga Bible English website

Depictions of Jesus in literature
Christian comics
Biblical comics